Patricio Javier Urrutia Espinoza, nicknamed Pato (born October 15, 1978, in Ventanas, Los Ríos), is a retired Ecuadorian politician and professional footballer.

Club career

Early career
Urrutia first started playing football for Liga Deportiva Cantonal de Ventanas, an amateur team in his hometown of Ventanas. He got his professional start for Barcelona in Guayaquil in 1996, but never got any playing time. He was later transferred to Calvi, also in Guayaquil, and again never saw playing time at the club. The following year, he was traded to Técnico Universitario in Ambato in 1998. For the Ambato club, he got significant played time, earning 30 caps in his first year. After a dry season in 1999, he was transferred to crosstown rival Macará. At the club, he was a significant part of the squad, earning 79 caps and scoring 12 goals in three seasons. In 2002, he was loaned back to Barcelona for a season, playing in 38 matches and scoring two goals before being transferred to LDU Quito.

LDU Quito
Urrutia joined LDU Quito in 2003, where has stayed since. During his time at the club, he has become a star and a prominent figure in the line-up as the team captain. Domestically, he has helped bring in three national titles to the club (2003, 2005 A, 2007). Internationally, he has brought success to himself and the club. In the 2005 Copa Libertadores, he was a joint top-scorer with 13 other players. He has since become the team's all-time top-scorer in the tournament with 18 goals.

In 2008, he was a starting figure of the squad that won the 2008 Copa Libertadores, the first international title for the club and the country. During the campaign, he scored 7 goals, including the 4th in the first leg of the final, and the first penalty of the shootout in the second leg, and was voted the Most Valuable Player of the final.

Fluminense
Urrutia was expected to transfer to Brazilian club Fluminense. The club had been interested in Urrutia since the 2008 Copa Libertadores Final, but negotiations fell through back in 2008. The parties involved finally reach an agree for Patricio's transfer in August 2009. Pato travelled to Rio de Janeiro for medical exams, but he did not pass the medical tests because of inflammation on his right knee, which had recently been operated on. Fluminense, who at the time was in 19th position and in the relegation zone, wanted to use Pato's skills immediately. The approximate one-month recovery time prevented the team from incorporating Pato from the beginning. An initial decision was made to not sign Pato at that time, forcing him to stay with LDU Quito. However, on August 26, 2009, Urrutía signed a two-year contract with Fluminense after a second round of medical exams showed the recovery time for his knee was less than expected.

Statistics

2008 FIFA Club World Cup: Apps (2), Goals (0)
2010 Suruga Bank Championship: Apps (1), Goals (1)

International career 
Urrutia was first called up to the national team on November 17, 2004, in a 2006 World Cup qualifying match against Brazil in Quito. He was chosen to be part of Ecuador's team in the World Cup games in Germany 2006. His appointment to the Ecuadorian squad for the 2006 FIFA World Cup raised a few eyebrows, as he had not made an appearance for them in months. He made his FIFA World Cup debut as a substitute for Agustín Delgado in the 2006 World Cup games against Poland and Costa Rica, where they won 2–0 and 3–0 respectively, securing a historic qualification to the round of sixteen. This was the best result yet for Ecuador in their World Cup history He was also called up for the 2007 Copa América. He scored the only goal of the game in a friendly match against Bolivia from the penalty spot on August 22, 2007. Since those tournaments, he has been regularly been called up to the squad and has become a major player in the 2010 World Cup qualifying campaign.

International goals

Honors
LDU Quito
 Serie A (4): 2003, 2005 Apertura, 2007, 2010
 Copa Libertadores (1): 2008
 Recopa Sudamericana (2): 2009, 2010

See also
Urrutia

References

External links
Player card on FEF 

1978 births
Living people
People from Ventanas
Ecuadorian footballers
Ecuadorian expatriate footballers
Ecuadorian people of Basque descent
Barcelona S.C. footballers
C.D. Técnico Universitario footballers
C.S.D. Macará footballers
L.D.U. Quito footballers
Fluminense FC players
Ecuadorian Serie A players
Campeonato Brasileiro Série A players
Expatriate footballers in Brazil
Ecuador international footballers
2006 FIFA World Cup players
2007 Copa América players
Association football midfielders